St. Catherine of Siena is a Roman Catholic parish in Trumbull, Connecticut, part of the  Diocese of Bridgeport.

History 
THE HISTORY OF THE PARISH OF SAINT CATHERINE OF SIENA,

Trumbull, Connecticut, where our parish is located, is today within the territory of the Roman Catholic Diocese of Bridgeport, which was established by Pope Pius XII in 1953, which comprises all of Fairfield County, in southwestern Connecticut.  Prior to that, it was part of the Diocese of Hartford, established in 1843 by Pope Gregory XVI, which then comprised all of Connecticut.  Earlier still, it was part of the Diocese of Boston, established in 1808 by Pope Pius VII, whose territory at the time encompassed all of New England.  And originally, when the Catholic Church was first being organized in the United States, Trumbull was part of the territory of the Archdiocese of Baltimore, established in 1789 by Pope Pius VI, which, as the first Catholic diocese in the United States, comprised, at the time, all the territory in the young and growing nation.

On February 11, 1955, the Most Reverend Lawrence J. Shehan, the first Bishop of Bridgeport, canonically established a new Parish, to be located in the “Nichols” section of Trumbull, territory which until then had been part of the Parish of Saint Charles Borromeo in Bridgeport.  Bishop Shehan appointed Father Edward D. Halloran to be the first Pastor of this new parish, which is thought to have been named for Saint Catherine of Siena in honor of Father Halloran's mother, Mrs. Catherine Halloran.

With the assistance of Father Thomas B. Gloster, Pastor of St. Charles Borromeo Parish, the Diocese of Bridgeport had purchased some 11 acres of land and two houses on Shelton Road in Trumbull.  This was to be the site of our parish church and campus.  While arrangements were being made for Sunday Masses to be offered within the Parish boundaries, Masses were offered for one month at the Thomas Hooker School in Bridgeport, beginning on February 20, 1955.  Beginning on March 20, 1955, with the permission of the Trumbull School Board, Mass was offered at Nichols School for over three years.

As plans for the church progressed, Bishop Shehan arranged for the Most Reverend Fulton J. Sheen, the celebrated author, television personality, and host of the award-winning television show Life is Worth Living, to present a lecture on March 22, 1957, at the Shakespeare Festival Theater in Stratford, the proceeds of which benefitted the Church Building Fund for Saint Catherine of Siena Parish.

This lecture was so successful that Bishop Shehan and Father Halloran, in gratitude, designated the sanctuary of Saint Catherine of Siena Church as a gift of Bishop Sheen.  Then an Auxiliary Bishop of New York and National Director of the Society for the Propagation of the Faith, Bishop Sheen went on to serve as Bishop of Rochester, New York, and later as Titular Archbishop of Newport.  He died on December 9, 1979, and is interred in the crypt of Saint Patrick's Cathedral in New York City.  His cause for beatification and canonization has been introduced.
 
From concept, to completion, to celebration

Ground was broken for our parish church in August 1957, the year which appears on the church's cornerstone.  The church was designed in the Norman Gothic style by Architect J. Gerald Phelan.  Its stained glass windows – depicting Apostles, Religious Founders, and the patron saints of the Catholic churches in the City of Bridgeport – were fashioned in Brussels, Belgium by the firm of J. Vosch.

The church was constructed by the E&F Construction Company of Bridgeport, and dedicated on September 21, 1958.  The Mass was celebrated by Father Halloran, with Father John J. Bennett as Deacon and Father Daniel J. Foley as Subdeacon; the homilist was Father Joseph A. Heffernan.  The Fairfield University Alumni Glee Club served as the choir for the Mass, and the organist was Father Thomas A. Murphy, S.J.  Bishop Shehan was present in choro for the Mass.

When the Parish of Saint Catherine of Siena was established, the reigning Pope was Pius XII; the President of the United States was Dwight D. Eisenhower; and the Governor of Connecticut was Abraham A. Ribicoff.  In 1955, the average house cost $22,000; the words “In God We Trust” were added to all U.S. currency; the arrest of Rosa Parks in Montgomery, Alabama, set the U.S. Civil Rights Movement in motion; the USS Nautilus became the first operational nuclear-powered submarine; and the popular game show “The $64,000 Question” aired for the first time.
 
Further Expansion

As the years unfolded, the Parish of Saint Catherine of Siena grew and expanded.  Recognizing the importance of handing on the gift of the Catholic Faith to new generations, by 1964 the parish had grown to the point that a school could be considered.  Father Halloran secured a commitment from the School Sisters of Notre Dame to teach at the school – a service which continued until the retirement of the school's longest-serving Principal, Sister Anne Marie Dorff, S.S.N.D., who led the school from 1978 until 2009.

In 1964, construction began simultaneously on the school building and on the parish rectory, both of which were designed by William F. Griffin, AIA, a Saint Catherine's parishioner.  In September, 1965, the first three classes of Saint Catherine of Siena School began: Grades 1, 2, and 7, with 71 students enrolled, originally meeting in the Church Hall.  Two more classes were added in 1966, when the school building was completed.  Two more classes were added in 1967, and the school reached its full capacity of eight grades and 250 students in 1968.  Kindergarten was added in 1975.

In April, 1967, Monsignor John F. McGough was named the second Pastor of Saint Catherine of Siena Parish by the Most Reverend Walter W. Curtis, the second Bishop of Bridgeport.  Msgr. McGough was followed nine years later by our third Pastor, Father Richard J. Monahan, who was also appointed by Bishop Curtis, and who served Saint Catherine's until his retirement from active ministry in 1991.

The 1970s and 1980s saw continued growth, together with the completion of several special projects, including an addition to Saint Catherine of Siena School in 1987, designed by parishioner Alfred Szymanski, AIA, of Fletcher Thompson, and built by the P. Francini Construction Company of Derby, Connecticut.  Additionally, during this period, a new side parking lot was installed, the church was air conditioned, and the mortgages of the church and the school were retired.

The Pastorate of Msgr. Shea

In July, 1991, Monsignor Richard J. Shea was installed as the fourth Pastor of Saint Catherine of Siena Parish.  Appointed to serve our Parish by then-Bishop Edward M. Egan, Msgr. Shea had served since 1976 as Principal of the nearby St. Joseph High School.  Msgr. Shea's 23-year pastorate saw enormous expansion and improvement.

Soon after Msgr. Shea's arrival, a new roof was installed on the church, as well as new exterior doors.  The stained glass windows were restored, and the Church Hall was upgraded.  Saint Catherine of Siena School was completely refurbished, and a Pre-K classroom was added.  In 1996, “Project Renovare” was undertaken, a major initiative of a liturgical renovation in the church, together with the addition of a side chapel.

In 1998, a two-phased “Project H.O.P.E.” was unveiled, to prepare our parish for the next half-century.  In 2000, the first phase of Project H.O.P.E. was completed as the Halloran Pastoral Center was dedicated, providing much-needed office and meeting space, together with secure storage space for parish records.

On March 19, 2001, the Solemnity of Saint Joseph, the Most Reverend William E. Lori, until then an auxiliary bishop of Washington, was installed as the fourth Bishop of Bridgeport in ceremonies held at Sacred Heart University in Fairfield.  The following day, at 7:30 a.m., Bishop Lori celebrated his first parish Mass in the Diocese of Bridgeport at Saint Catherine's.  His parents, Frank and Margaret Lori, of Clarksville, Indiana, who were still in Connecticut for the Installation celebrations, were among the attendees.

Also in 2001, the parish embarked on the second phase of Project H.O.P.E., called “Faith in God – Faith in Families.”  This campaign made possible the construction of the McClinch Family Center, a large and beautiful event space for parish meetings and social events.

In May, 2011, Msgr. Shea celebrated the 50th anniversary of his priestly ordination with a Mass of Thanksgiving at Saint Catherine's, which was attended by Bishop Lori.  Three years later, on the occasion of his retirement from active ministry, a grateful parish presented Msgr. Shea with a new car, together with a specially crafted Altar, for his use in the celebration of daily Mass in his retirement.

On the occasion of his 80th birthday in April, 2016, Msgr. Shea returned to St. Catherine's for a celebratory Mass, during which the Marian Prayer Garden on the church grounds was dedicated in his honor.
 
New Beginnings

On September 19, 2013, the Most Reverend Frank J. Caggiano, until then an auxiliary bishop of Brooklyn, was installed as the fifth Bishop of Bridgeport, during a Mass celebrated at Saint Theresa Church in Trumbull. The receptions before and after his Installation Mass were held at the McClinch Family Center, here at Saint Catherine’s. These receptions were attended by thousands of the faithful and other honored guests, by hundreds of priests from the Dioceses of Bridgeport and Brooklyn and beyond, and by over thirty bishops, including the Apostolic Nuncio to the United States of America, the Most Reverend Carlo Maria Viganò.

Soon after arriving in the Diocese of Bridgeport, Bishop Caggiano convoked a diocesan Synod to plan for the pastoral and ministerial future of the diocese. We are honored that the working sessions of the Synod were held in the McClinch Family Center at Saint Catherine of Siena Parish.

On March 15, 2015, Father Joseph A. Marcello was installed as the fifth Pastor of Saint Catherine of Siena Parish. An alumnus of Saint Catherine of Siena School, Father Marcello’s pastorate has focused on building a welcoming, inviting parish, which joyfully, authentically, and energetically lives its Roman Catholic faith, centered on the living presence of Jesus Christ in the Holy Eucharist.

In recent years, St. Catherine’s has warmly welcomed hundreds of new families into the parish, and called forth their talents for the good of our community, and in service to Our Lord and one another.

On August 15, 2017, the Solemnity of the Assumption of the Blessed Virgin Mary, Father Marcello announced CHRIST AT THE CENTER, a major initiative of liturgical renewal to beautify and enhance the sanctuary of our church for future generations. Designed by noted architect Duncan G. Stroik, AIA, construction for the project was carried out in late 2018 and early 2019, during which time Masses were said in the McClinch Family Center.  The project having been brought to fruition, St. Catherine of Siena Church was solemnly consecrated by Bishop Caggiano on March 24, 2019.

In March, 2020, the global COVID-19 pandemic broke out around the world.  From March until June 2020, no public Masses were celebrated in our diocese and in most other dioceses.  Mass was still said each day at St. Catherine’s, though and, via our new state-of-the-art livestreaming system, Mass was made available remotely throughout the pandemic.  In-person Eucharistic Adoration was available every Sunday afternoon throughout the pandemic, and confessions were heard outside, in the parking lot, on a drive-through basis.  Parish staff members, working from home, telephoned or emailed hundreds of parishioners as a way of staying in touch with them, and several drive-through food drives were held to assist the neediest.  As the world continues to emerge from the pandemic, St. Catherine’s has emerged strong and re-energized for our mission of evangelization.

On St. Joseph’s Day, March 19, 2021 a beautiful new addition to the sanctuary of our church was unveiled and blessed: a stained glass window, next to the baptismal font, depicting 10 Saints and Blesseds who have lived in recent centuries, and who represent all the states of life in the Church: married life, the priesthood, the consecrated life, and single life.  The Saints and Blesseds who are depicted in this stained glass window are: Saint Gianna Beretta Molla, Saint John Henry Newman, Saint Josephine Bakhita, Saint André Bessette, Saints Louis & Zélie Martin, Blessed Pier Giorgio Frassati, Blessed Chiara Luce Badano, Blessed Michael McGivney, and Saint Teresa of Calcutta.  Following the Mass, the parish was presented with a first-class relic of Blessed Michael McGivney by Past Supreme Knight Carl Anderson, Supreme Secretary Patrick Mason, and Supreme Advocate John Marrella, on behalf of Supreme Knight Patrick Kelly.

2022 saw a special milestone in the life of our parish: the First Mass of a newly ordained priest from our parish, Father Colin Lomnitzer.  Father Lomnitzer and his family were received into full communion with the Catholic Church at the Easter Vigil, 2005 and, since then, Father Lomnitzer was a sacristan, altar server, and MC at Mass during his years as a student at Fairfield Prep and Catholic University.  Having discerned a priestly vocation, he entered formation at the St. John Fisher Seminary Residence, and completed his priestly formation at St. Joseph’s Seminary in Yonkers, New York.  He was ordained to the Priesthood on June 4, 2022 by Bishop Caggiano, and celebrated his First Holy Mass at St. Catherine’s on June 5, 2022, the Solemnity of Pentecost.

The Mission Continues

The story of buildings and milestones tells only part of the story of this or any parish. Indeed, the most consequential aspects of that story have not been recorded by history and may never be known, except to God. The most important parts of our parish history are the stories of souls: of men and women, young and old, rich and poor, well-known and unknown – yet each of infinite value – who have encountered the Lord Jesus Christ here, have come to friendship with Him here, have received His mercy and forgiveness here, and here have been set on the path to eternal salvation. This is the reason our parish exists, and this is the mission we carry into the future.

With faith in the Lord Jesus Christ, the founder of the Church, with confidence in the never-failing intercession of the Blessed Virgin Mary, the Mother of God and Mother of the Church, and with gratitude to God for the foresight and the sacrifices of those who have gone before us, we look to the future with trust in God’s providence and with zeal for our mission of evangelization, as we seek to invite everyone we can into friendship with the Lord Jesus Christ, in the communion of His Church.

Images

Saints whose Relics are deposited into the Altar of Sacrifice 

Saint Catherine of Siena (1347-1380), the Patroness of this Parish, was the 23rd of the 25 children of Giacomo di Benincasa and Lapa Piagenti. When she was 16 years old, motivated by a vision of St. Dominic, she entered the Third Order of the Dominicans, the female branch known as the Mantellates. While still living at home, she dedicated herself to intense prayer, penance and works of charity, especially for the benefit of the sick. Blessed with a mystical relationship with Christ and a deep devotion to His Passion, St. Catherine was sought after for spiritual guidance by people of every walk of life. She led countless souls closer to God, including Pope Gregory XI, who was living at Avignon at that time; she energetically and effectively urged him to return to Rome. She travelled widely to bring about the internal reform of the Church and to foster peace among quarrelling states. Saint Catherine of Siena is invoked as Co-Patroness of the City of Rome, Patroness of Italy, and Co-Patroness of Europe. She was canonized in 1461 by Pope Pius II, and in 1970, Saint Paul VI declared her a Doctor of the Church. Her body rests in the Church of Santa Maria sopra Minerva, Rome. Her liturgical memorial is celebrated on April 29.

Saints Eugenius and Candidus are martyrs who lived in the third century. When the Diocese of Bridgeport was established, the Holy See gave a portion of their relics to the first Bishop of Bridgeport, and their relics have been placed within the altars of many churches in this diocese. The relics of Ss. Eugenius and Candidus which have been deposited in our new Altar of Sacrifice were once deposited within the original altars of this church.

Saint Jean-Marie Baptiste Vianney (1786-1859), the Curé of Ars, is the patron saint of parish priests. For over forty years, his unflagging zeal in preaching, prayer, and penance bore astounding fruit as he catechized children and adults, reconciled penitents, and brought countless souls to a deeper life in Christ. Intensely devoted to the Holy Eucharist, he spent up to 18 hours a day hearing confessions, and endured several instances of physical attacks by the devil. His liturgical memorial is celebrated on August 4.

Saint Pius X (1835-1914) was born Giuseppe Sarto in humble circumstances in Riese, a small village in Venetia. Ordained a priest on September 18, 1858, he served as curate, parish priest, Bishop of Mantua, and Patriarch of Venice. Elected Pope on August 4, 1903, he took the name Pius X, and labored with untiring self-sacrifice and great energy as supreme pastor of the Church. An intrepid defender of the purity of Catholic doctrine, he worked for the restoration of divine worship, especially Gregorian chant. Deeply devoted to Jesus Christ in the Holy Eucharist, he lowered the age for First Holy Communion, and urged the faithful to frequent, worthy reception of this Sacrament. He died on August 20, 1914 and was canonized by Pope Pius XII on May 29, 1954. His liturgical memorial is celebrated on August 21.

Saint Elizabeth Ann Bayley Seton (1774-1821), wife and mother of five, was raised Episcopalian and, having been widowed at a young age, became Catholic through the friendship and example of Catholic business associates of her late husband, through whom she came to understand the reality of Christ’s presence in the Holy Eucharist. Some years later, in Emmitsburg, Maryland, she founded the Daughters of Charity of St. Joseph for the care of the sick and the education of children. A pioneer of the Catholic school system in the United States, she was the first native-born American citizen to be canonized. Her liturgical memorial is celebrated on January 4.

Saint André Bessette (1845-1937), was born in Quebec. Orphaned at the age of 12, he tried his hand at various trades but was not successful in any of them. He could barely read or write, and was sickly most of his life. At the age of 15 he became a Brother of the Congregation of Holy Cross, and for forty years worked as porter at the College of Notre Dame. With unbounded confidence in the intercession of St. Joseph, he became the instrument of extraordinary graces in the lives of countless people. Throngs from all over Canada and beyond came to him seeking healing and guidance. When he died at the age of 91, nearly a million people filed past his casket. His body rests in St. Joseph’s Oratory in Montreal, which he founded and built. It is perhaps the world’s principal shrine in honor of St. Joseph. He was beatified in 1982 and canonized in 2010. His liturgical memorial is celebrated on January 6.

Saint Frances Xavier Cabrini (1850-1917), born in the Lombardy region of Italy, was the foundress of the Missionary Sisters of the Sacred Heart of Jesus. Asked by Pope Leo XIII to travel to the United States to serve the Italian immigrants there, she and her Sisters arrived in 1889. Despite numerous setbacks and opposition from both Church and civil leaders, she began apostolates of teaching and healthcare among poor immigrant communities. In time, she opened schools and hospitals throughout the United States, as well as in Latin and South America. In 1907 she became a naturalized citizen of the United States. She died on December 22, 1907, after collapsing while wrapping Christmas gifts for children. In 1946, she was canonized by Pope Pius XII, becoming the first United States citizen to be raised to the dignity of the altars. Her body rests in the St. Frances Xavier Cabrini Shrine in Washington Heights, New York City. Her liturgical memorial is celebrated on the anniversary of her beatification in 1938 by Pope Pius XI, November 13.

Saint John Henry Newman (1801-1890) was born in London, and was for over twenty years an Anglican clergyman and Fellow of Oriel College, Oxford. His studies of the early Church led him progressively towards the Catholic Faith, and on October 9, 1845, he embraced “the one true fold of the Redeemer” and was received into full communion with the Catholic Church.  In 1847 he was ordained a priest and went on to found the Oratory of Saint Philip Neri in England. He was a prolific and deeply influential writer on a variety of subjects. In 1879 he was created Cardinal by Pope Leo XIII. Praised for his humility, unstinting care of souls, and contributions to the intellectual life of the Church, he died in Birmingham on 11 August 1890. Canonized by Pope Francis on October 13, 2019, his liturgical memorial is celebrated on the anniversary of his reception into the Catholic Church, October 9.

References

External links 
 St. Catherine of Siena Trumbull- Website
 St. Catherine's YouTube Channel
 Diocese of Bridgeport

Roman Catholic churches completed in 1956
Roman Catholic churches in Trumbull, Connecticut
Churches in Fairfield County, Connecticut
20th-century Roman Catholic church buildings in the United States